The Atlantic Bronze Age is a cultural complex of the Bronze Age period in Prehistoric Europe of approximately 1300–700 BC that includes different cultures in Britain, France, Ireland, Portugal, and Spain.

Trade

The Atlantic Bronze Age is marked by economic and cultural exchange that led to the high degree of cultural similarity exhibited by the coastal communities from Central Portugal to Galicia, Armorica, Cornwall and Scotland, including the frequent use of stones as chevaux-de-frise, the establishment of cliff castles, or the domestic architecture sometimes characterized by the roundhouses. Commercial contacts extended from Sweden and Denmark to the Mediterranean. The period was defined by a number of distinct regional centres of metal production, unified by a regular maritime exchange of some of their products. The major centres were southern England and Ireland, north-western France, and western Iberia.

The items related to this culture are frequently found forming hoards, or they are deposited in ritual areas, usually watery contexts: rivers, lakes and bogs. Among the more noted items belonging to this cultural complex we can count the socketed and double ring bronze axes, sometimes buried forming large hoards in Brittany and Galicia; war gear, as lunate spearheads, V-notched shields, and a variety of bronze swords —among them carp's-tongue ones— usually found deposited in lakes, rivers or rocky outcrops; and the elites' feasting gear: articulated roasting spits, cauldrons, and flesh hooks, found from central Portugal to Scotland.

The origins of the Celts were attributed to this period in 2008 by John T. Koch and supported by Barry Cunliffe, who argued for the past development of Celtic as an Atlantic lingua franca, later spreading into mainland Europe. They argue that communities adopted early Late Bronze Age Urnfield (Bronze D and Hallstatt A) elite status markers such as grip-tongue swords and sheet-bronze metalwork, along with new specialist know-how needed for their production and ritual knowledge about their 'proper' treatment upon deposition which they see as indicating possible processes linked to language shift. In 2013, Koch saw this east to west elite contact as the simplest explanation for the genesis of Celtic languages with a Proto-Celtic homeland in west-central Europe. However, this stands in contrast to what remains the more generally accepted view that Celtic origins lie with the Central European Hallstatt C culture.

Gallery

See also 
 Magacela stele
 Bronze Age Europe
 Armorican Tumulus culture
 Argaric culture
 Bronze Age Britain
 Cornish Bronze Age
 Urnfield culture
 Nordic Bronze Age
 Tumulus culture
 Unetice culture

References

External links

Spaniards search for legendary Tartessos in a marsh
Moor Sands finds, including a remarkably well preserved and complete sword which has parallels with material from the Seine basin of northern France
3000-year-old shipwreck shows European trade was thriving in Bronze Age

2nd-millennium BC establishments
2nd-millennium BC disestablishments
Archaeological cultures of Southwestern Europe
Archaeological cultures of Western Europe
Archaeological cultures in Belgium
Archaeological cultures in England
Archaeological cultures in France
Archaeological cultures in Ireland
Archaeological cultures in Portugal
Archaeological cultures in Scotland
Archaeological cultures in Spain
Bronze Age cultures of Europe
Bronze Age England
Bronze Age France
Bronze Age Ireland
Bronze Age Portugal
Bronze Age Scotland
Bronze Age Spain
Bronze Age Wales